Sergio Roberto Pereira de Souza (born May 29, 1977) is a Brazilian football player.

References

Kagawa Soccer Library
Albirex Niigata

1977 births
Living people
Brazilian footballers
J2 League players
Albirex Niigata players
Association football midfielders